The Ugly People Vs The Beautiful People is the fourth album by the American band The Czars, released on October 16, 2001, on the Bella Union label. It was recorded in Denver, Colorado in the winter of 2001.

Track listing

Personnel
 John Grant – Lead vocals, piano
 Roger Green – Guitar
 Jeff Linsenmaier - Drums, backing vocals
 Andy Monley - Guitar, backing vocalBass
 Chris Pearson - Bass

References

2001 albums
John Grant (musician) albums
Bella Union albums